There have been a vast number of designs of steam boiler, particularly towards the end of the 19th century when the technology was evolving rapidly. A great many of these took the names of their originators or primary manufacturers, rather than a more descriptive name. Some large manufacturers also made boilers of several types. Accordingly, it is difficult to identify their technical aspects from merely their name. This list presents these known, notable names and a brief description of their main characteristics.

See also 
 Glossary of boiler terminology

A

B

C

D

E

F

G

H

I

J

K

L

M

N

O

P

R

S

T

V

W

Y

References 

Fire-tube boilers
Water-tube boilers
Steam boilers
Boilers
Steam power